André Leonard Nieuwlaat (born 24 December 1965) is a Norwegian former footballer who played for Råde, Moss (1982–85), Drøbak-Frogn (1986), Rosenborg (1987), Drøbak-Frogn (1988), Frigg (1989), Vålerenga (1990), Sprint-Jeløy (1991), Fredrikstad (1992), Ekholt and Vansjø/Svinndal. Nieuwlaat became top-scorer with nine goals in Rosenborg's 1987 season.

References

External links 
 

1965 births
Living people
Norwegian footballers
Moss FK players
Drøbak-Frogn IL players
Rosenborg BK players
Frigg Oslo FK players
Vålerenga Fotball players
Fredrikstad FK players
Eliteserien players
Association football forwards
SK Sprint-Jeløy players
People from Moss, Norway
Sportspeople from Viken (county)